Lake Madison Lutheran Church is a historic church in Lake County, South Dakota near Madison, about  to the northeast of the town.  The church was completed in 1898 and was added to the National Register of Historic Places in 2000.

The church was organized in 1878 and held services in a sod house.  It served Norwegian immigrants.  The present church building was begun in 1890 and was completed in 1898.

References

Lutheran churches in South Dakota
Churches on the National Register of Historic Places in South Dakota
Gothic Revival church buildings in South Dakota
Churches completed in 1898
Churches in Lake County, South Dakota
1898 establishments in South Dakota
National Register of Historic Places in Lake County, South Dakota